In the investment banking sector, particularly in India, devolvement is a process whereby if an investment issue is undersubscribed, an underwriter is required to subscribe to the remaining shares.  The outstanding unsubscribed amount devolves onto the underwriter. This is also known as hard underwriting.  The Securities and Exchange Board of India publishes guidelines and a recommended method of computation relating to the extent of the devolvement onto a particular underwriter in the case where there are multiple underwriters, or sub-underwriters.

Notes

References

Further reading 
 

Monetary policy
Public finance
Capital markets of India
Investment banking
Underwriting